Jackson Liberty High School is a four-year comprehensive public high school serving students in ninth through twelfth grades from Jackson Township, in Ocean County, New Jersey, operating as part of the Jackson School District. It is the district's newest secondary school and is the sister high school of Jackson Memorial High School.

As of the 2021–22 school year, the school had an enrollment of 1,129 students and 85.1 classroom teachers (on an FTE basis), for a student–teacher ratio of 13.3:1. There were 320 students (28.3% of enrollment) eligible for free lunch and 76 (6.7% of students) eligible for reduced-cost lunch.

History and design
The school opened in September 2006 with 800 students in 9th and 10th grades. The school was constructed at a cost of $70 million (equivalent to $ million in ) with a maximum capacity of 1,900 students in grades 9-12.

Built in between 2005 and 2006, the school has two floors. The bottom floor holds a liberal arts (history, English, language) wing (commonly referred to as "C" wing) as well as a mathematics and science wing. (Commonly referred to as "B" wing) There is a cafeteria in both wings. The upstairs wing will hold additional mathematics and science wings. Additionally "D" wing is home to the arts (fine art, television production, CAD, graphic design) classes. A central atrium ("A" wing) connects "D", "C", and "B" wings into a central great hallway. The theater holds about 900 people and is equipped to handle presentations as well as performances. The two gymnasiums are next to each other and they have a weight room and an athletic trainer's office. The football field is surrounded by a regulation size track which could be used for meets. There is also a music wing behind the auditorium and a lecture hall in the atrium. Jackson Liberty High School is Wi-Fi ready and wireless LAN stations are set up throughout the school. Teachers are given swivel-head laptops which have a wireless card which connect them to projectors in each classroom. All multimedia functions from the classroom projectors. The student-run television channel, JLib Today, as well as a DVD and VCR hook up to the projector for large format display. The school auditorium is suited to seat 799 people and is equipped with state-of-the-art lighting and sound systems.

Awards, recognition and rankings
The school was the 128th-ranked public high school in New Jersey out of 339 schools statewide in New Jersey Monthly magazine's September 2014 cover story on the state's "Top Public High Schools", using a new ranking methodology. The school had been ranked 218th in the state of 328 schools in 2012, after being ranked 215th in 2010 out of 322 schools listed.

Schooldigger.com ranked the school as tied for 129th out of 376 public high schools statewide in its 2010 rankings (an increase of 67 positions from the 2009 rank) which were based on the combined percentage of students classified as proficient or above proficient on the language arts literacy and mathematics components of the High School Proficiency Assessment (HSPA).

Athletics
The Jackson Liberty High School compete in Division B South of the Shore Conference, an athletic conference comprised of public and private high schools in Monmouth and Ocean counties along the Jersey Shore. The league operates under the jurisdiction of the New Jersey State Interscholastic Athletic Association (NJSIAA). With 833 students in grades 10-12, the school was classified by the NJSIAA for the 2019–20 school year as Group III for most athletic competition purposes, which included schools with an enrollment of 761 to 1,058 students in that grade range. The school was classified by the NJSIAA as Group III South for football for 2018–2020.

The school participates as the host school / lead agency in a joint ice hockey team with Jackson Memorial High School and Point Pleasant Borough High School. The co-op program operates under agreements scheduled to expire at the end of the 2023–24 school year.

Jackson Liberty has its student section, the Red Zone, in which students wearing a red zone shirt receive free admission to home football and basketball games. Liberty has a section at the football games for the red zone in the bleachers behind the left end zone. The red zone plays a part in pep rallies, and all around school spirit.

In football the rivals of Jackson Liberty High School are Jackson Memorial High School, Lakewood High School and Monsignor Donovan High School. Tim Osborn was the first football coach at Jackson Liberty High School, taking over the team when the program started. After 2–8 seasons and 4–6 seasons, Coach Osborn led the Lions to their first winning season in school history in 2012 at 6-4, and to their first playoff appearance, in a loss to Colonia High School. This season however, was Coach Osborn's final season leading the Liberty Lions. On April 13, 2013, Tim Osborn died of a heart attack while at the gym at age 53. In May 2013, Jim Sharples was named as the head coach of the Lions. He was the defensive coordinator under Coach Osborn.

The boys bowling team won the Group II state championship in 2019 and 2020. The team won the 2019 Tournament of Champions, defeating Group IV champion and ToC runner-up South Brunswick High School in the final match.

Fine arts

Music
Jackson Liberty has had a successful Marching Band and Jazz Band since the program's inception in 2007. In 2010, the Jackson Liberty Jazz Band competed throughout the State and earned numerous Best Rhythm Section, Trumpet Section, Trombone Section, and Saxophone Section awards. They have also earned 10 best soloist awards. On April 24, 2010, the Jackson Liberty Jazz Band competed in the NJAJE Division II State Finals in Princeton, New Jersey. Liberty placed 3rd and also won two best soloist awards which were awarded to Tenor Sax player Gary Basko, and Bass Guitarist Zane Decker. In 2013 in three straight competitions the marching band beat Jackson Memorial in overall music for the first time ever.
During the 2017 band season, the JLHS Marching band won for the first time Tournament of Bands State Championship, Metropolitan Championship and Atlantic Coast Championship in the 4A division under the direction of Scott Katona.

AtLib Players
The students in the Drama Club at Jackson Liberty High School are called the AtLib Players. The Drama Club is directed by Mrs. Mathias, and Miss Hanlon (Now Mrs. Szoke). Past productions put on by the AtLib players include Guys and Dolls, A Christmas Carol, All Shook Up, The Crucible, The Father of the Bride, Little Shop of Horrors, The Miracle Worker, Anything Goes, Big: the musical, It's a Wonderful Life, Miracle On 34th Street and Oklahoma!.

JTV
The Jackson TV program is run out of Jackson Liberty. They teach the TV Tech Class, which makes music videos, short films, etc. They compete annually at the STN (Student Television Network) Competition. Competing locations that include Texas, Florida, California and more recently Atlanta, Georgia. JTV is three-time National Champions in the Music Video category of STN. The students that are a part of JTV also help film sporting events, and other school functions, such as plays and concerts.

Administration
The principal of Jackson Liberty High School is Geoffrey Brignola. His administration team includes three assistant principals.

Notable alumni
 Cassidy Benintente (born 1994), soccer player who plays as a defender and midfielder for Sky Blue FC of the National Women's Soccer League.

References

External links 
Jackson Liberty High School
Jackson School District

School Data for the Jackson School District, National Center for Education Statistics

2006 establishments in New Jersey
Educational institutions established in 2006
Jackson Township, New Jersey
Public high schools in Ocean County, New Jersey